Bazarghat is one of the suburbs in Khairatabad, Hyderabad, India. It is connected to the old city of Hyderabad.
Bazarghat includes Redhills, which now serves as a residence for Mr. Mohd Mahboob Ali Khan and family.

Transport
Bazarghat is connected by buses run by TSRTC and is well connected to Hyderabad city.

References

Neighbourhoods in Hyderabad, India